MKNK may refer to:

 MKNK1, a human protein-coding gene
 MKNK2, a human protein-coding gene
 MkNk, a rare blood type of MN blood group system